This article lists events that occurred during 1990 in Estonia.

Incumbents

Events
 22 February – The Estonian legislature affirmed the declaration, where immediate negotiations with Supreme Soviet of the Soviet Union were demanded to restore the independence of Estonia.

 11-12 March – Congress of Estonia convened, and declared itself as constitutional representative of Estonian people.
 18 March – elections to Supreme Soviet of Estonia. The most seats (43) were won by Estonian Popular Front.
 30 March – Supreme Soviet of Estonia declared a transitional period for independence. In addition, the validity of Soviet power in Estonia was denied.

 8 May – the first five articles of 1938 Constitution of Estonia was reinstated. In addition the formal name of independent Estonia (i.e. the Republic of Estonia) was restored; also state emblems, the flag and the hymn was restored. The Supreme Soviet is thereafter translated as the Supreme Council.
 mid-May – President of the Soviet Union annulled Estonia's declaration of independence. About 2,000 pro-Soviet activists tried to occupy the parliament building.

 30 June-2 July – National Song and Dance Festival in Tallinn.

 3 April – the leader of Estonian Popular Front Edgar Savisaar was elected to Prime Minister by Supreme Soviet of Estonia.

 Estonian School of Diplomacy was established.

Births
4 October – Signy Aarna, footballer

Deaths

See also
 1990 in Estonian television

References

 
1990s in Estonia
Estonia
Estonia
Years of the 20th century in Estonia